Sweden participated in the Eurovision Song Contest 2018. The Swedish broadcaster Sveriges Television (SVT) organised the national final Melodifestivalen 2018 in order to select the Swedish entry for the 2018 contest in Lisbon, Portugal. After a six-week-long competition consisting of four heats, a Second Chance round and a final, "Dance You Off" performed by Benjamin Ingrosso emerged as the winner after achieving the highest score following the combination of votes from eleven international jury groups and a public vote.

Background 

Sweden had won the contest on six occasions: in 1974 with the song "Waterloo" performed by ABBA, in 1984 with the song "Diggi-Loo Diggi-Ley" performed by Herreys, in 1991 with the song "Fångad av en stormvind" performed by Carola, in 1999 with the song "Take Me to Your Heaven" performed by Charlotte Nilsson, in 2012 with the song "Euphoria" performed by Loreen, and in 2015 with the song "Heroes" performed by Måns Zelmerlöw.

The Swedish national broadcaster, Sveriges Television (SVT), broadcasts the event within Sweden and organises the selection process for the nation's entry. Since 1959, SVT has organised the annual competition Melodifestivalen in order to select the Swedish entry for the Eurovision Song Contest.

Before Eurovision

Melodifestivalen 2018 

Melodifestivalen 2018 is the Swedish music competition that would select Sweden's entry for the Eurovision Song Contest 2018. 28 songs competed in a six-week-long process which consisted of four heats on 3, 10, 17 and 24 February 2018, a second chance round on 3 March 2018, and a final on 10 March 2018. The six shows were hosted by David Lindgren. Seven songs competed in each heat—the top two qualified directly to the final, while the third and fourth placed songs qualified to the second chance round. The bottom three songs in each heat were eliminated from the competition.

Heats and Second Chance round 
 The first heat took place on 3 February 2018 at the Löfbergs Arena in Karlstad. "Dance You Off" performed by Benjamin Ingrosso and "My Turn" performed by John Lundvik qualified directly to the final, while "Patrick Swayze" performed by Sigrid Bernson and "All the Feels" performed by Renaida advanced to the Second Chance round. "Livet på en pinne" performed by Edward Blom, "Osby Tennessee" performed by Kikki Danielsson, and "Solen lever kvar hos dig" performed by Kamferdrops were eliminated from the contest.
 The second heat took place on 10 February 2018 at the Scandinavium in Gothenburg. "Shuffla" performed by Samir and Viktor and "Last Breath" performed by Liamoo qualified directly to the final, while "In My Cabana" performed by Margaret and "Songburning" performed by Mimi Werner advanced to the Second Chance round. "Allting som vi sa" performed by Ida Redig, "Det finns en väg" performed by Jonas Gardell, and "Titta vi flyger" performed by Stiko Per Larsson were eliminated from the contest.
 The third heat took place on 17 February 2018 at the Malmö Arena in Malmö. "A Bitter Lullaby" performed by Martin Almgren and "Party Voice" performed by Jessica Andersson qualified directly to the final, while "Everyday" performed by Méndez and "Cuba Libre" performed by Moncho advanced to the Second Chance round. "Stark" performed by Barbi Escobar, "Min dröm" performed by Kalle Moraeus and Orsa Spelmän, and "Cry" performed by Dotter were eliminated from the contest.
 The fourth heat took place on 24 February 2018 at the Fjällräven Center in Örnsköldsvik. "For You" performed by Mariette and "Fuldans" performed by Rolandz qualified directly to the final, while "Every Single Day" performed by Felix Sandman and "Never Learn" performed by Olivia Eliasson advanced to the Second Chance round. "Icarus" performed by Emmi Christensson, "Mitt paradis" performed by Elias Abbas, and "Break That Chain" performed by Felicia Olsson were eliminated from the contest.
 The Second Chance round (Andra chansen) took place on 3 March 2018 at the Kristianstad Arena in Kristianstad. "In My Cabana" performed by Margaret, "All the Feels" performed by Renaida, "Every Single Day" performed by Felix Sandman, and "Everyday" performed by Méndez qualified to the final.

Final 
The final took place on 10 March 2018 at the Friends Arena in Solna, Stockholm. Twelve songs competed—two qualifiers from each of the four preceding heats and four qualifiers from the Second Chance round. The combination of points from a viewer vote and eleven international jury groups determined the winner, Benjamin Ingrosso with the song "Dance You Off". The viewers and the juries each had a total of 638 points to award.

At Eurovision 
According to Eurovision rules, all nations with the exceptions of the host country and the "Big Five" (France, Germany, Italy, Spain and the United Kingdom) are required to qualify from one of two semi-finals in order to compete for the final; the top ten countries from each semi-final progress to the final. The European Broadcasting Union (EBU) split up the competing countries into six different pots based on voting patterns from previous contests, with countries with favourable voting histories put into the same pot. On 29 January 2018, a special allocation draw was held which placed each country into one of the two semi-finals, as well as which half of the show they would perform in. Sweden was placed into the second semi-final, to be held on 10 May 2018, and was scheduled to perform in the second half of the show.

Once all the competing songs for the 2018 contest had been released, the running order for the semi-finals was decided by the shows' producers rather than through another draw, so that similar songs were not placed next to each other. Sweden was set to perform in position 15, following the entry from Latvia and preceding the entry from Montenegro.

Voting
Voting during the three shows involved each country awarding two sets of points from 1-8, 10 and 12: one from their professional jury and the other from televoting. Each nation's jury consisted of five music industry professionals who are citizens of the country they represent, with their names published before the contest to ensure transparency. This jury judged each entry based on: vocal capacity; the stage performance; the song's composition and originality; and the overall impression by the act. In addition, no member of a national jury was permitted to be related in any way to any of the competing acts in such a way that they cannot vote impartially and independently. The individual rankings of each jury member as well as the nation's televoting results were released shortly after the grand final.

Points awarded to Sweden

Points awarded by Sweden

Detailed voting results
The following members comprised the Swedish jury:
 Robert Sehlberg (jury chairperson)head of Music MTG Radio
 Mariette Hansson (Mariette)singer
 singer, songwriter
 Arantxa Alvarezhost, singer, radio DJ
  (K-One)composer, producer

References

External links
 Official SVT Eurovision website

2018
Countries in the Eurovision Song Contest 2018
Eurovision
Eurovision